"" is the national anthem of Cuba. Perucho Figueredo, who took part in the battle, wrote and composed the song. The melody, also called "", was composed by Figueredo in 1867.

Overview

On October 20, 1868, the Cuban forces obtained the capitulation of the Spanish colonial authorities in Bayamo, the jubilant people surrounded Figueredo and asked him to write an anthem with the melody they were humming. Right on the saddle of his horse, Figueredo wrote the lyrics of the anthem, which was longer than the current official version. Figueredo was captured and executed by the Spanish two years later.  Just before the firing squad received the Fire command, Figueredo shouted the line from his song: "Morir por la Patria es vivir".

Officially adopted by Cuba as its national anthem in 1902, upon the foundation of the Republic, it was retained even after the revolution of 1959. The Cuban composer Antonio Rodriguez-Ferrer contributed the musical introductory notes to the Cuban national anthem.

In addition to the "Himno de Bayamo", there are two other well-known Cuban songs called "La Bayamesa". The first Bayamesa was composed in 1851 by Carlos Manuel de Céspedes and José Fornaris at the request of their friend Francisco Castillo Moreno, who is sometimes also credited with the lyrics. After 1868, during the Cuban war, a "mambí" version of "La Bayamesa" became popular. It has the same melody but different lyrics. Many years later, in 1918, the composer and trovador Sindo Garay, from Santiago de Cuba, composed a song that he called "Mujer Bayamesa"; popular usage shortened the title to "La Bayamesa".

Lyrics
Originally, the song had three stanzas. The last two stanzas were excluded when the anthem was officially adopted in 1902, because the lyrics were seen to be excessively anti-Spanish and too long compared with the other stanzas.

References

External links

 Cuba: La Bayamesa - Audio of the national anthem of Cuba, with information and lyrics (archive link)
 Cuban National Anthem Website Cuban National Anthem interpreted by Cuban artists with music and voice.
 Different Mp3 files (nacion.cult.cu)
 Infos about the hymn (nacion.cult.cu) 
Las Bayamesas Article in Spanish on the three songs named La Bayamesa

Cuban songs
North American anthems
National symbols of Cuba
Bayamo
Spanish-language songs
1868 songs
National anthems
Songs about Cuba
National anthem compositions in E-flat major